Guy Richard Goronwy Edwards, QGM (born 30 December 1942) is a former racing driver from England. Best known for his sportscar and British Formula One career, as well as for brokering sponsorship deals, Edwards participated in 17 World Championship Formula One Grands Prix, debuting on 13 January 1974. He scored no championship points.

Early life
Edwards attended Liverpool College and studied at Durham University (University College), graduating in 1964.

With aspirations of racing cars he went straight from university to Brands Hatch Racing School and persuaded the owner to allow him to perform secretarial work in exchange for 10 free laps a week in circuit cars. After saving up money he was able to purchase a Mini Cooper-S, with which he gained his first competitive experience. Edwards upgraded to a Chevron B8 once he gained sponsorship and soon entered Formula 5000.

Career

Edwards competed in the Aurora Formula One Championship in the UK from 1978 to 1980, scoring several wins driving March, Fittipaldi and Arrows chassis. In 1979, he scored the only race win for a Fittipaldi Formula One chassis.

He is also renowned for being one of the drivers, along with Arturo Merzario, Brett Lunger and Harald Ertl who saved Niki Lauda from his burning car during the 1976 German Grand Prix, for which he was later awarded a Queen's Gallantry Medal for his bravery. Currently, he works helping racing drivers to get sponsorship.

His son Sean, also a racing driver, was killed in a motor racing accident at Queensland Raceway in Australia on 15 October 2013. He was training a younger driver when the Porsche 911 GT3 the pair were driving had a high-speed crash and subsequently caught fire.

In October 2018, media falsely reported him dead.

Racing record

Complete World Endurance Championship results
(key) (Races in bold indicate pole position) (Races in italics indicate fastest lap)

Footnotes

Complete 24 Hours of Le Mans results

Complete European F5000 Championship results
(key) (Races in bold indicate pole position; races in italics indicate fastest lap.)

Complete Formula One World Championship results
(key)

Complete Formula One Non-Championship results
(key)

Complete Shellsport International Series results
(key) (Races in bold indicate pole position; races in italics indicate fastest lap)

Complete European Formula Two Championship results
(key)

Complete British Formula One Championship results
(key) (Races in bold indicate pole position; races in italics indicate fastest lap)

Complete British Touring Car Championship results
(key) (Races in bold indicate pole position in class) (Races in italics indicate fastest lap in class – 1 point awarded all races)

Complete European Touring Car Championship results
(key) (Races in bold indicate pole position) (Races in italics indicate fastest lap)

† Not eligible for points.

References

External links
 Rainer, N. & Diepraam, M. 2000. Grand Prix minnow, Aurora great. 8W. Christmas 2000. Accessed: 21-08-2007
 

1942 births
Living people
English racing drivers
English Formula One drivers
Hill Formula One drivers
Hesketh Formula One drivers
BRM Formula One drivers
Recipients of the Queen's Gallantry Medal
24 Hours of Le Mans drivers
Sportspeople from Macclesfield
British Touring Car Championship drivers
World Sportscar Championship drivers
British Formula One Championship drivers
People educated at Liverpool College
Alumni of University College, Durham